Boom is one of the albums the band Garmonbozia recorded and distributed at concerts before changing their name to Blitzen Trapper and releasing albums commercially.  Boom contains a very early version of the song, "Sadie"; a more polished version of the song would later close Blitzen Trapper's Destroyer of the Void album in 2010.

Track listing

References 

Blitzen Trapper albums
2002 albums